Lawfare is the use of legal systems and institutions to damage or delegitimize an opponent, or to deter individual's usage of their legal rights.

The term may refer to the use of legal systems and principles against an enemy, such as by damaging or delegitimizing them, wasting their time and money (e.g. SLAPP suits), or winning a public relations victory.

Alternatively, it may describe a tactic used by repressive regimes to label and discourage civil society or individuals from claiming their legal rights via national or international legal systems. This is especially common in situations when individuals and civil society use non-violent methods to highlight or oppose discrimination, corruption, lack of democracy, limiting freedom of speech, violations of human rights and violations of international humanitarian law.

Etymology
The term is a portmanteau of the words law and warfare. Perhaps the first use of the term "lawfare" was in the 1975 manuscript Whither Goeth the Law, which argues that the Western legal system has become overly contentious and utilitarian as compared to the more humanitarian, norm-based Eastern system.

A more frequently cited use of the term was Charles J. Dunlap, Jr.'s 2001 essay authored for Harvard's Carr Center. In that essay, Dunlap defines lawfare as "the use of law as a weapon of war". He later expanded on the definition, explaining lawfare was "the exploitation of real, perceived, or even orchestrated incidents of law-of-war violations being employed as an unconventional means of confronting" a superior military power.

Colonel Charles Dunlap describes lawfare as "a method of warfare where law is used as a means of realizing a military objective". In this sense lawfare may be a more humane substitute for military conflict. Colonel Dunlap considers lawfare overall a "cynical manipulation of the rule of law and the humanitarian values it represents".

Benjamin Wittes, Robert Chesney, and Jack Goldsmith employed the word in the name of the Lawfare Blog, which focuses on national security law and which has explored the term and the debate over what lawfare means and whether it should be considered exclusively a pejorative.

Universal jurisdiction
Lawfare may involve the law of a nation turned against its own officials, but more recently it has been associated with the spread of universal jurisdiction, that is, one nation or an international organization hosted by that nation reaching out to seize and prosecute officials of another.

Israeli–Palestinian conflict
Many cases have been brought forward against Israeli officials and those associated with Israel's military, accusing them of war crimes. These cases have been heard in both Israel and in other countries.

According to Canadian MP and former minister Irwin Cotler, the use of law to delegitimize Israel is present in five areas: United Nations, international law, humanitarian law, the struggle against racism and the struggle against genocide.

Joshua Mintz, writing in The Jerusalem Post in September 2011, referring to the Israel fears of lawfare, says, "it's quite possible that Israel, at least within the legal landscape, may actually benefit from the Palestinian statehood bid."

South China Sea dispute

In contrast to most world governments, the People's Republic of China has explicitly recognized lawfare ("falu zhan" or "legal warfare") as an essential component of its strategic doctrine. The activities of the People's Republic of China in relation to the territorial disputes in the South China Sea is frequently cited example of lawfare by the Chinese government.  In particular, China has asserted sovereign control over several areas in the South China Sea, and has restricted access to areas within its alleged sovereign territory or exclusive economic zone. In support of its claims, China has issued official state declarations (e.g., notes verbal) and enacted domestic laws that assert its sovereignty or effective control of portions of the sea.

Other examples
The government of China has used lawsuits in foreign courts to repress Chinese dissidents abroad.

Harvard School of Law professor Jack Goldsmith, an opponent to the expansion of international human rights and universal jurisdiction, states in his book The Terror Presidency that Defense Secretary Donald Rumsfeld was concerned with the possibility of lawfare waged against Bush administration officials, and that Rumsfeld "could expect to be on top of the list". Rumsfeld addresses the effects of lawfare in his memoir Known and Unknown.

See also
Asymmetric warfare
Bush Six
Fourth generation warfare
Hong Kong protests against China extradition and national security laws
Roerich Pact
Strategic lawsuit against public participation
Tibet since 1950
Unrestricted Warfare
Vexatious litigation
War as metaphor

References

Political neologisms
Warfare post-1945
Psychological warfare
Propaganda techniques
Public relations
International criminal law
Law of war
National security
International security
War on terror
Counterterrorism